Mackinac Rendezvous' is a BSA event, that takes place on a weekend in September, every other year, since 1987, in the Mackinac region of Michigan.

The Boy Scouts at the Mackinac Rendezvous XIV (2013) set a world record for the most people posed in the shape of a symbol: 1132 people formed the shape the Fleur-de-lis.

See also
Michigan International Camporee
President Gerald R. Ford Field Service Council
Scouting in Michigan

References

Central Region (Boy Scouts of America)
Michigan culture
Scouting events
1987 establishments in Michigan
Recurring events established in 1987